Rice roll may refer to:

Bánh cuốn, a Vietnamese dish
Gimbap, a Korean dish
Gỏi cuốn, a Vietnamese dish
Makizushi, a Japanese dish

See also 
Rice noodle roll, a Cantonese dish